Saint Pelagia, Pelagia of Antioch, Pelagia the Penitent or Pelagia the Harlot was a legendary Christian saint and hermit in the 4th or 5th century.

Pelagia may also refer to:

People
 Pelagia the Virgin or Pelagia of Antioch ( 3rd century), a Christian saint, virgin, and martyr
 Marina the Monk, Pelagia or Mary of Alexandria, a Christian saint of Byzantine Syria
 Januarius and Pelagia (died 320), Christian martyrs and saints in Armenia
 Pelagia of Tarsus or Pelagia the Martyr ( 4th century), a legendary Christian saint and martyr in Cilicia 
 Pelagia of Tinos (19th c.), a Christian saint who found the lost icon Our Lady of Tinos in 1822
 Pelagia Gesiou-Faltsi (born 1935), scholar in the field of civil procedure in Greece
 Pelagia Goulimari (born 1964), Greek-British academic
 Pelagia Papamichail (born 1986), Greek basketball player
 Pelagia Mendoza y Gotianquin (1867–1939), the first female sculptor in the Philippines
 Sister Pelagia, the fictional heroine of novels by Boris Akunin
 Pelagia, a fictional character in the novel and film Captain Corelli's Mandolin

Places
 Agia Pelagia ("St Pelagia"), a seaside fishing village in Crete, Greece
 Pelagia, Łódź Voivodeship, a village in Łask County, Poland

Organisms
 Fraus pelagia, a species of moth
 Pelagia (genus), a genus of jellyfish
 Pelagia benovici, former name of Mawia benovici, a Mediterranean species of jellyfish 
 Pelagia colorata, former name of Chrysaora colorata, a Californian species of jellyfish
 Pelagia noctiluca or mauve stinger, a jellyfish in the family Pelagiidae
 Listonella pelagia, a species of marine bacteria

Others 
 1190 Pelagia, an asteroid named for the Russian astronomer, Pelageya Shajn
 RV Pelagia, a Dutch sea research vessel
The 12th Colossus in Shadow of the Colossus

See also
 Pelageya, а Russian singer
 Pelageya (disambiguation)
 Marina (disambiguation), the Latinized form of Pelagia